Events in the year 1991 in Israel.

Incumbents
 President of Israel – Chaim Herzog
 Prime Minister of Israel – Yitzhak Shamir (Likud)
 President of the Supreme Court – Meir Shamgar
 Chief of General Staff – Dan Shomron until 1 April, Ehud Barak
 Government of Israel – 24th Government of Israel

Events

 17 January – Gulf War: Iraq fires eight Scud missiles into Israel in an unsuccessful bid to provoke Israeli retaliation.
 22 January – Gulf War: Three Scuds and one Patriot missile fired to intercept them hit Ramat Gan in Israel, wounding 96 people; three elderly people die of heart attacks.
 1 April – Ehud Barak is appointed as the 14th Chief of Staff of the Israel Defense Forces.
 4 May – Duo Datz represents Israel at the Eurovision Song Contest with the song “Kan” ("Here"), achieving third place.
  24–25 May – Operation Solomon: A covert Israeli military operation to bring Ethiopian Jews to Israel commences.
 16 December – United Nations General Assembly Resolution 4686 revokes UN General Assembly Resolution 3379, which had equated Zionism with a form of racism. Israel had made revocation of resolution 3379 a condition for Israel's participation in the Madrid Peace Conference of 1991. In the history of the UN, this is the only resolution that has ever been revoked.

Israeli–Palestinian conflict 
The most prominent events related to the Israeli–Palestinian conflict which occurred during 1991 include:

 30 October – 1 November – Madrid Conference: an international peace conference held in the Spanish capital Madrid aimed at promoting the peace process between Israel, the Palestinian Arabs and Arab countries. The conference was hosted by the government of Spain and co-sponsored by the United States and the USSR.

Notable Palestinian militant operations against Israeli targets

The most prominent Palestinian Arab terror attacks committed against Israeli targets during 1991 include:

Notable Israeli military operations against Palestinian militancy targets

The most prominent Israeli military counter-terrorism operations (military campaigns and military operations) carried out against Palestinian militants during 1991 include:

Notable deaths
 1 February – Herzl Rosenblum (born 1903), Russian (Lithuania)-born Israeli journalist and politician, signer of the Israeli Declaration of Independence.
 7 February – Amos Yarkoni (born 1920), Israeli Bedouin IDF soldier.
 3 July – Ephraim Urbach (born 1912), Russian (Poland)-born Israeli Talmudic scholar.
 10 August – Hans Jakob Polotsky (born 1905) Swiss-born Israeli orientalist, linguist and university professor.
 14 September – Moshe Goshen-Gottstein (born 1925), German-born Israeli Linguist and Bible scholar.
 2 November – Yosef Almogi (born 1925), Polish-born Israeli politician.
 27 December – Eitan Livni (born 1919), Polish-born Revisionist Zionist activist, Irgun commander and Israeli politician.

Major public holidays

See also
 1991 in Israeli film
 1991 in Israeli television
 1991 in Israeli music
 1991 in Israeli sport
 Israel in the Eurovision Song Contest 1991

References

External links

 IDF History in 1991 @ dover.idf.il